The Miss Denmark 2019 pageant was held on June 7, 2019. The winner of the national Danish pageant will represent Denmark at Miss Universe 2019.

Final results

Special awards

Official delegates
Meet the 25 national delegates competing for the title of Miss Denmark 2019:

References

External links
Official Website

2019
2019 in Copenhagen
2019 beauty pageants